Champions II is a 1982 role-playing game supplement for Champions published by Hero Games.

Contents
Champions II is the first rules supplement for Champions, and features new skills and powers, enhancements for the combat system, rules for designing headquarters and vehicles, numerous charts and descriptions, record sheets, and short articles discussing things like normal, non-player characters, experience points, the law, money, and "Campaigning Champions".

Reception
Allen Varney reviewed Champions II in The Space Gamer No. 62. Varney commented that "there's much here of interest, lasting or not.  The record sheets alone go a long way toward justifying the price. Champions II is definitely worth having, if not quite ."

Pete Tamlyn reviewed Champions II for Imagine magazine, and stated that " Champions players [...] will probably be interested in useful new rule systems. Champions II is quite good in this respect, covering a lot of stuff that doubtless got squeezed out of the initial book by all the character design material. Designing your own hideouts and vehicles is covered, as are character income, encounter charts and legal implications of superheroing."

Reviews
Different Worlds #30 (Sept., 1983)

References

Champions (role-playing game) supplements
Role-playing game supplements introduced in 1982